The Eretnids were an Anatolian beylik that succeeded the Ilkhanid governors in Anatolia and that ruled in a large region extending between Caesarea (Kayseri), Sebastea (Sivas) and Amaseia (Amasya) in Central Anatolia between 1328 and 1381. The dynasty was founded by Eretna, an officer of Uyghur<ref>Yılmaz Öztuna, Devletler ve hânedanlar: Türkiye : 1074 - 1990, Vol.2, Türkiye Kültür Bakanlığı, 2005, p.51, Online Edition</ref>Jonathan M. Bloom, Sheila Blair, Oxford University Press, 2009, p.60, Online Edition "In the early 14th century, the city passed to the Uighur chief Eretna." origin in the service of Ilkhanid governors of Anatolia. Although short-lived, the Beylik of Eretna left important works of architecture. The name of Eretna may be derived from Sanskrit word Ratna'' "Jewel" or Tuvan (Turkic) "Ertine" (эртине) "treasure, jewel, value, esteem, appreciate, dignify, treasure, cherish".

The dynasty's founder, Eretna, was a Mongol officer of Uyghur origin in the service of Timurtash, the Ilkhanid governor of Anatolia. After his master unsuccessfully revolted in 1327 to ally with the Mamluks in response to the fate of his father Chupan, Ilkhan Abu Said appointed Eretna a governor of Anatolia. Eretna, who established his own beylik with the title of Sultan under the protection of the Mamluk Sultanate (Cairo), also knew Arabic and was considered a scholar.

After Eretna's death, his lands were nibbled away by the Ottomans in the west and the Aq Qoyunlu in the east due to internal disputes between the Eretnids. The Beylik's last ruler, Muhammad II, was replaced by his vizier Kadi Burhan al-Din who reigned in the same region for another eighteen years, a period some sources consider as a continuation of the same institutional structure, while other sources treat as being separate.

List of Eretna rulers 
Ala al-Din Eretna ibn Jafar  1336–1352
Giyath al-Din Muhammad 1352–1366
'Ali 1366–1380
Muhammad Çelebi 1380
Kadi Burhan al-Din

See also
 List of Shia Muslim dynasties

References

External links

 

Anatolian beyliks
History of Kayseri Province
History of Sivas Province
History of Amasya Province
States in medieval Anatolia
States and territories established in 1335
States and territories established in 1381